Avondale may refer to:

Places

Australia 
 Avondale, New South Wales, a village in New South Wales
Avondale, Parramatta, a heritage-listed former residence and now offices at 25 O'Connell Street, Parramatta, New South Wales
 Avondale, Queensland, a village in Queensland

Canada 
 Avondale, Newfoundland and Labrador
 Avondale, Hants, Nova Scotia in the Hants County
 Avondale, Pictou, Nova Scotia in Pictou County

Ireland 
 Avondale Forest, an estate in County Wicklow
 Avondale House, birthplace of Irish political leader Charles Stewart Parnell

New Zealand 
 Avondale, Auckland
 Avondale, Canterbury, a suburb of Christchurch

Scotland 
 Avondale, South Lanarkshire
 Avondale Castle
 Avondale Landfill, Falkirk

United States 
 Avondale (Birmingham), a neighborhood of Birmingham, Alabama
 Avondale, Arizona
 Avondale, Colorado
 Avondale (Jacksonville), a neighborhood of Jacksonville, Florida
 Avondale, Georgia
 Avondale (Columbus, Georgia), a neighborhood
 Avondale, Chicago, a community area of Chicago, Illinois
 Avondale, Louisiana
 Avondale, Maryland, an unincorporated area in Prince George's County
 Avondale (Westminster, Maryland), historic home listed on the NRHP in Maryland
 Avondale, Missouri
 Avondale, Stark County, Ohio, an unincorporated community near Canton
 Avondale, Cincinnati, a neighborhood of Cincinnati, Ohio
 Avondale, Pennsylvania
 Avondale, Texas
 Avondale, McDowell County, West Virginia
 Avondale Colliery near Plymouth, Pennsylvania

Zimbabwe 
 Avondale, Harare

Education 

 Avondale College, an Australian tertiary education provider
 Avondale College, Auckland, a secondary education provider
 Avondale School (disambiguation)

Transportation 

 Avondale Bridge (disambiguation)
 Avondale Shipyard, an independent shipbuilding company
 Avondale railway station, New Zealand, on the Western Line of the Auckland railway network
 Avondale railway station, Queensland, a closed railway station on the North Coast railway
 Avondale station (MARTA), a train station in Decatur, Georgia, United States
 A boat, later renamed Hero
 Avondale Coaches in Scotland

Other fields 

 Avondale Agricultural Research Station, one of thirteen research farms/stations operated by Western Australia's Department of Agriculture

 Avondale FC, an Australian semi-professional football club
 Avondale Mine Disaster at the Avondale Colliery (1869)
 Avondale Park (Chicago) is a 1.7 acre park in the Avondale community area of Chicago, Illinois.
 Lynn-Avon United (formerly Avondale FC and Avondale United), a New Zealand football club

See also 
 Avon (disambiguation)
 Avondale Estates, Georgia
 Avondale Heights, Victoria
 Avondale High School (disambiguation)
 Avondale House, in Avondale, County Wicklow, Ireland, is the birthplace and home of Charles Stewart Parnell
 Duke of Clarence and Avondale
 Earl of Avondale
 Lord Avondale, referring to the dale (or valley) of the Avon Water in Scotland